Negar (also Romanized as Negār; also known as Qanāt Bāgh and Nīgār) is a city in the Central District of Bardsir County, Kerman Province, Iran.  At the 2006 census, its population was 9,291, in 1,583 families.

References

Populated places in Bardsir County

Cities in Kerman Province